WLYE-FM (94.1 MHz) is a radio station broadcasting a country music format. Licensed to Glasgow, Kentucky, United States, the station serves the Bowling Green area.  The station is currently owned by Forever Communications, Inc. and features programming from Real Country (Westwood One).

The station's studios and offices are located at 902 West Main Street in downtown Glasgow. WLYE's transmitter is located on the southeastern outskirts of the city off Kentucky Route 90.

History
Following the 1988 purchase of WCLU by Royse Radio, Inc. (Henry Royse II, owner), intentions to launch an FM companion station for the locally-based AM station were in place.  The station was assigned the call letters WGBV on January 4, 1995, when the FCC first granted the construction permit for the frequency of 94.1 MHz. The station signed on in 1997, but as a full-time satellite station of Auburn-licensed but Bowling Green-based WBVR-FM. In January 2002, Forever Broadcasting Inc. (Carol Logan, president) reached an agreement to purchase the station from Royse Radio for a reported sale price of $416,412. After the sale was finalized, on September 3, 2003, call letters were changed to the current WLYE. From that day on, the station has been broadcasting a Classic Country format, billing itself as Real Country Willie 94.1.

WLYE was also the official broadcaster of Edmonson County High School football and boys' and girls' basketball games from the 2003–2004 season until 2014. The rights to those games became Internet-exclusive upon that year's launch of EdmonsonVoice.com, an online-based news website specifically catering to the Brownsville and Edmonson County area.

From February 2017 until December 2019, WLYE's programming began to be simulcast over WBGN-AM 1340 and its associated translator W300DA, both of Bowling Green. WBGN has since switched to an oldies format, but still retained their status as the Bowling Green Hot Rods' official broadcaster (until 2021) and its affiliation with the  Nashville Predators Radio Network. In February 2022, the station's programming began simulcasting over 102.3 MHz via WLLI in Munfordville.

Programming
Since 2003, WLYE broadcasts a classic country format. The station also airs The Real Trader program weekday mornings at around 8:30 am CT. The Real Trader is a weekday program devoted to people selling items in classified ads.

References

External links

LYE-FM
Country radio stations in the United States
Radio stations established in 1997
Glasgow, Kentucky